New Hampshire Route 125 is a  north–south state highway in Rockingham, Strafford and Carroll counties in southeastern New Hampshire. The southern terminus is in Plaistow at the Massachusetts state line, where the road continues south into Haverhill as Massachusetts Route 125. The northern terminus is in Wakefield at New Hampshire Route 16 and New Hampshire Route 153.

Although NH 125 is mostly an undivided two-lane highway, it regularly carries heavy truck and tourist traffic, especially in the summer months, when it is used as a toll-free alternative to Interstate 95 and the Spaulding Turnpike.

The Epping–Lee–Barrington section is known as the Calef Highway, named after state senator Austin L. Calef and family who owned the locally famous Calef's Country Store in Barrington. The Milton section is the southernmost part of the White Mountain Highway. The Brentwood section is officially named the Officer Stephen Arkell Memorial Highway, named for a police officer of that community who was killed in the line of duty.

History 
The section of NH 125 between Epping and East Barrington (the intersection with NH 9) was built on the grade of the Boston and Maine Railroad Worcester, Nashua and Portland Division, opened by the Nashua and Rochester Railroad in 1876.

Calef's County Store, a locally famous family-owned shop which first opened in 1869, is located near the intersection of NH 9 and NH 125 in Barrington.

The northern section of NH 125 between downtown Rochester and Wakefield occupies part of the original alignment of NH 16 (first designated as New England Interstate Route 16). The historic northern terminus of NH 125 was at the intersection of Columbus Avenue and South Main Street in downtown Rochester.

Route description

Plaistow, Kingston, Brentwood 

The NH 125 designation begins on Plaistow Road where Massachusetts Route 125 crosses the state line from Haverhill, Massachusetts, into Plaistow, New Hampshire. NH 121A also begins here and splits off as Main Street towards downtown Plaistow. NH 125 stays to the west of town and is initially a four-lane divided highway serving as the local shopping strip. After bypassing the downtown area, NH 125 crosses over NH 121A, then turns northeast and transitions into an undivided two-lane rural highway before crossing into the town of Kingston. In Kingston, NH 125 is first joined by NH 111 which approaches from the west, then  later by NH 107 which approaches from the east. Bypassing east of downtown Kingston, the three routes are overlapped for just over  before NH 111 turns east towards Exeter. NH 107 and NH 125 continue northwest for another , then NH 107 turns off towards Fremont while NH 125 continues north and crosses into the town of Brentwood. The highway has one major junction in Brentwood with NH 111A (the main road in town) and continues north towards Epping.

Epping, Lee, Barrington (Calef Highway) 
Upon crossing into Epping, NH 125 becomes known as the Calef Highway and expands to four lanes before interchanging with the NH 101 freeway at exit 7. The highway turns northeast to bypass downtown and crosses NH 27 and the Lamprey River, narrowing back to two lanes thereafter. NH 125 meets the western terminus of NH 87 and the southern terminus of NH 155 before turning due north and entering Lee. NH 125 crosses NH 152 and turns slightly east, bypassing downtown Lee (which is directly served by NH 155) to the west. Continuing north, NH 125 then intersects with U.S. Route 4 at the Lee Traffic Circle, a major two-lane roundabout. NH 125 enters Barrington and stays along the town's east side, crossing the Bellamy River and then NH 9 further north. The highway continues north and enters the Rochester city limits.

Rochester 
The Calef Highway moniker ends as NH 125 enters Rochester, and the road becomes known as Gonic Road (after the neighborhood of Gonic which NH 125 passes through). The highway crosses the Isinglass River and passes alongside the Rochester County Club as it continues north towards downtown Rochester. After passing through Gonic, NH 125 has a major interchange with the Spaulding Turnpike (NH 16) at exit 12, and the road becomes Columbus Avenue as it transitions into an urban route. The highway crosses the Cocheco River and crosses South Main Street (which carries NH 108 and NH 202A, both of which terminate here) just south of downtown. While NH 202A heads straight into the heart of town, NH 125 follows Columbus Avenue in a partial loop around the east side of downtown. On the north side of downtown, Columbus Avenue ends and NH 125 turns north onto Wakefield Street, which becomes Milton Road. NH 125 has an interchange with US 202 and NH 11, which provide access to the nearby Spaulding Turnpike at exit 16, as well as to points east in Maine. As NH 125 continues north, it begins to parallel the Salmon Falls River (which forms the border between New Hampshire and Maine) to the west, and the Spaulding Turnpike to the east. The highway transitions back into a rural route as it enters the town of Milton.

Milton, Wakefield 
Upon crossing into Milton, NH 125 becomes known as the White Mountain Highway, in recognition of its former status as the major route north to the White Mountains Region (it carries the original alignment of NH 16 before the Spaulding Turnpike was built). The highway meets the eastern terminus of NH 75, which connects to the nearby turnpike at exit 17, before passing through downtown Milton, continuing to run along the western side of the Salmon Falls River. After leaving the downtown area, NH 125 turns slightly westward away from the river and continues winding north, running nearly adjacent to the turnpike. As it approaches the Branch River, a tributary of the Salmon Falls, NH 125 turns west and interchanges with the Spaulding Turnpike again at exit 18. This interchange marks the northern terminus of the Spaulding Turnpike, and the White Mountain Highway designation continues northward on NH 16. NH 125 crosses into Wakefield and passes through the village of Union as Main Street, then intersects with NH 153. The roadway continues north as NH 153 (Wakefield Road).

Major intersections

References

External links

 New Hampshire Satte Route 125 on Flickr

125
Transportation in Rockingham County, New Hampshire
Transportation in Strafford County, New Hampshire
Transportation in Carroll County, New Hampshire